Spačva is a small river in eastern Croatia. It rises in the swampy Spačva region, takes in river Breznica, and flows into the Bosut between Lipovac and Apševci.

See also
Spačva (region)

References

Rivers of Croatia
Slavonia
Syrmia
Geography of Vukovar-Syrmia County